Arzni Airport (previously known as Yerevan Yeghvard Airport) is a military airport located near the town of Nor Hachn,  north of Yerevan and  west of Arzni.

The airport serves as a training base and is attached to the Armenak Khanperyants Military Aviation University, operated by the Ministry of Defence of Armenia. The airport also hosts several military exhibitions and training exercises as well as RC Aircraft events. The airport currently hosts several Antonov An-2, Yak-52 and Piper Archer aircraft as well as several Mil Mi-2 helicopters used for training.

See also

 Armed Forces of Armenia
 List of airports in Armenia
 List of the busiest airports in Armenia
 Military of Armenia
 Transport in Armenia

References

Airports in Armenia
Airports built in the Soviet Union
Buildings and structures in Kotayk Province
Armenian Air Force